Piers Gough  (born 24 April 1946) is an architect in the practice CZWG. His younger brothers are the composer Orlando Gough and Jamie Gough, the University of Sheffield's senior lecturer in Town and Regional Planning.

Gough was born in Brighton, grew up in Hove, and went to Uppingham School, Rutland. He studied at the Architectural Association School of Architecture in London and qualified in 1971. He co-founded the architectural practice Campbell Zogolovitch Wilkinson and Gough (CZWG), in 1975.

While working on his own house in east London in the 1970s, he fell through the floor and damaged his spine. The drop was only 10 feet but he was hospitalised for six months and now walks with the aid of a stick.

He made his name with CZWG's work in the redevelopment of the London Docklands (1988). His projects include:1988: Janet Street-Porter's house, central London; 1991: Crown Street regeneration, Glasgow; 1993: Westbourne Grove public lavatories, west London; 1994: Brindley Place Cafe, Birmingham; 2000: Green Bridge, Mile End Park, east London, Maggie's Centre, Nottingham (2011) and Canada Water Library, Southwark; 2011.

Gough was listed in the 2018 London Evening Standard's The Progress 1000: London's most influential people (Visualisers: Architecture)

Gough was appointed a CBE for services to architecture in the 1998 Queen's Birthday Honours List and was elected a Royal Academician in 2002.

References

External links
 Profile on Royal Academy of Arts Collections

1946 births
Living people
20th-century English architects
Architects from Brighton
English people with disabilities
Alumni of the Architectural Association School of Architecture
Royal Academicians